Ruda Śląska railway station is a railway station in Ruda Śląska, Poland. As of 2012, it is served by Koleje Śląskie on the Gliwice–Częstochowa route, calling at Katowice and Zawiercie.

References
Ruda Śląska railway station at kolej.one.pl

External links 
 

Railway stations in Silesian Voivodeship
Railway stations served by Koleje Śląskie
Railway station